Paralomis aculaeta is a species of king crab known only by the male holotype found off the coast of Prince Edward Island, a sub-Antarctic island, by J.R. Henderson on the HMS Challenger in 1888. Its carapace was first described as having a width of 39 mm and length of 42 mm. It is distributed in the western outreach of the Southwest Indian Ridge. The crab is caught during bottom trawling for Lepidonotothen squamifrons, at a frequency of 25–30%.

References

King crabs
Crustaceans of the Indian Ocean
Crustaceans of South Africa
Crustaceans described in 1888